Following is a list of stations of the Metro of Tunis, the light rail serving the city of Tunis.

Line 1
Line 1 opened in 1985.

References

Tram transport in Tunisia
Buildings and structures in Tunis
Tunis Light Metro